Samuel Neal Brand (born 27 February 1991) is a Manx cyclist, who currently rides for UCI ProTeam .

Brand was diagnosed with diabetes at the age of 10. In 2018, he joined the UCI Professional Continental team , after riding with the team as a stagiaire in 2017.

References

External links

1991 births
Living people
British male cyclists
Manx male cyclists
People with type 1 diabetes